Thrill of Youth is a 1932 American Pre-Code drama film directed by Richard Thorpe and starring June Clyde and Dorothy Peterson.

Cast
 June Clyde as Jill Fenwick  
 Allen Vincent as Jack Thayer  
 Dorothy Peterson as Seena Sherwood  
 George Irving as Jeff Thayer  
 Matty Kemp as Chet Thayer  
 Lucy Beaumont as Grandma Thayer  
 Tom Ricketts as Grandpa Zachary Thayer  
 Caryl Lincoln as Marcia Dale  
 Ethel Clayton as Alice Fenwick  
 Bryant Washburn as Colby Sherwood

Plot

References

Bibliography
 Pitts, Michael R. Poverty Row Studios, 1929-1940. McFarland & Company, 2005.

External links
 

1932 films
1932 drama films
1930s English-language films
American drama films
Films directed by Richard Thorpe
American black-and-white films
Chesterfield Pictures films
1930s American films